Adam Green (born March 31, 1975) is an American actor, filmmaker and musician, best known for his work in horror and comedy films, including the Hatchet franchise, 2010's Frozen, and the television series Holliston.

Originating from Holliston, Massachusetts, Green earned a Bachelor of Science degree in Television and Film production at Hofstra University and founded ArieScope Pictures with fellow filmmaker Will Barratt in 1998. Green was also the lead singer for the hard rock and metal band "Haddonfield".

Background 

Green was born and raised in Holliston, Massachusetts. After graduating from high school in 1993, he left for New York to study film and television production at Hofstra University graduating in 1997 with a Bachelor of Science degree. After studies, Green worked in Boston making local commercials for Time Warner Cable, where he met his future collaborator Will Barratt. In 1998, together they founded production company ArieScope Pictures and the following year made their first feature-length film – semi-biographic comedy Coffee & Donuts . Encouraged by friends and success in small film festivals, in 2000, Green packed his belongings and drove out to Hollywood. However, the film did not receive much attention and for a few years the new filmmaker was struggling with urban life and career. He worked as DJ at the Rainbow Bar & Grill, while also undertaking various supporting roles in media industry. Green describes experience: "The next three years saw loads of struggle and disappointment as I did every odd job I could score in Hollywood and waited for something to pan out with C&D." During that period the upcoming director wrote the original installment of what would become the Hatchet franchise and met his future wife Rileah Vanderbilt.

Feature film and television career 
Steadily working within a small group of friend-actors, Green self-produced most of his 2000s projects. By 2013, he had released two seasons of television sitcom Holliston together with seven theatrical feature films, including horror Hatchet (2006) and thriller Frozen (2010). Consequently, director became a member of the Splat Pack, – group of filmmakers, who brought back gore and splatter, consisting of Eli Roth, Alexandre Aja, Neil Marshall, Rob Zombie, Greg McLean, Darren Lynn Bousman, and James Wan.

Coffee & Donuts 
Coffee & Donuts (2000) is a semi-biographical, lighthearted romantic comedy about two friends, Adam and Steve, who strive to launch their morning radio program of the small town, while Adam concurrently struggles to overcome a breakup. Green made the feature film for only $400, using equipment from the cable advertising facility that he was working for at the time and employing volunteers for everything from cast to crew. Green starred in the lead role, while other parts were played by Steven C. DeWitt Jr., Katie Bove and Jeff Davison. This amateur production has not been widely released.

In 2003, Touchstone Pictures bought Coffee & Donuts, hired Green as a writer and remade the film into a sitcom for UPN. The pilot episode, being produced by Tom Shadyac's Shady Acres, was rejected and for the next five years, the rights remained with Touchstone. After regaining the rights in 2009, there were efforts to sell it to another network. However, the sitcom got canceled again. Eventually, the original concept was completely re-developed as Holliston and released by FEARnet . Green has since expressed his wish to independently distribute the original film, but also referred to issues such as the high price of clearing the soundtrack rights.

Hatchet 
Hatchet (2006) is the first feature of Green's successful franchise. The horror comedy tributes old-school American slashers and follows a group of tourists, who take a swamp boat ride and wind up pursued by the ghost of local legend Victor Crowley. Theatrically released on September 7, 2007, the film was relatively well received by some critics and earned a worldwide horror cult following, resulting in three sequels for 2010, 2013, and 2017.

Spiral 
Spiral (2007) is Joel David Moore's and JD Boreing's thriller, which Green co-directed. The story follows an isolated telemarketer (Moore), who befriends a new co-worker and then struggles with troubling past feelings, threatening his personal dignity.
Critics hailed Spiral as "nothing short of brilliant" and "the closest thing you'll get to Hitchcock in this day and age". The film won Gold Vision Award at the 2008 Santa Barbara Film Festival.

Unmade Aquaman film
Green was commissioned to write a screenplay for an animated Aquaman film, which was ultimately not produced, by Warners Bros.

Grace 
Grace (2009) is Paul Solet's dramatic thriller, which was produced by Green (ArieScope Pictures), who discovered the project during Hatchet's festival tour. The story depicts a woman who loses her baby in the womb, but still carries it to term, only to find out that the baby has returned to life and can only survive on human blood. Starring Jordan Ladd, Grace premiered at the Sundance Film Festival in January 2009 and was released in theatres and on DVD later that year.

Frozen 
Frozen (2010) is Green's low-budget thriller, starring Kevin Zegers, Emma Bell and Shawn Ashmore. The film premiered at the Sundance Film Festival and was released in North American theaters on February 5, 2010. Metacritic rated it 45/100 based on 16 reviews. Rotten Tomatoes reported a 62% approval rating and an average score of 5.9/10; the site's critical consensus reads: "Writer/director Adam Green has the beginnings of an inventive, frightening yarn in Frozen, but neither the script nor the cast are quite strong enough to truly do it justice."
On the other hand, some critics were pleased with the results. Jeannette Catsoulis of The New York Times writes: "A minimalist setup delivers maximum fright in [this] nifty little chiller that balances its cold terrain with an unexpectedly warm heart." And Rex Reed presents more impressions in his sensationalist article in The New York Observer: "I was left so paralyzed with terror by this movie that I chewed a whole pencil in half watching it."

Hatchet II 
Hatchet II (2010) is franchise's sequel, starring Kane Hodder and Danielle Harris. Green eagerly promoted his film by pre-advertising (Anchor Bay, MySpace), in press (Creation Entertainment, Comic-Con, Frozen events) and with credits (Adam Green's Hatchet II). Filmed in the beginning of the year, sequel premiered at the London FrightFest Film Festival 2010. The theatrical release made headlines when distributor Dark Sky agreed with AMC Theatres to bypass MPAA ratings' board and on October 1, 2010 released the unrated Hatchet II, which got revoked within hours. The officially reported reason by AMC was poor performance, but Green has alluded to controversy with MPAA. Metacritic rated the film 49/100 based on 11 reviews. Rotten Tomatoes reports a 36% approval rating and an average score of 4.2/10 based on 33 reviews; the site's consensus reads: "Funnier and more gleefully gory than most slasher sequels, Hatchet II aims for so-bad-it's-good territory, but can't quite hack it."

Chillerama: "Anne Frankenstein" 
Green wrote and directed segment "The Diary of Anne Frankenstein" as part of the 2011 comedy/horror anthology Chillerama, which consists of four short films by four different filmmakers. The parody "Anne Frankenstein" is shot in black and white and made entirely in German to look and feel like a lost 1940's foreign film. While Green cast authentic German speaking actors for all roles, the lead role of Adolf Hitler is portrayed by Joel David Moore, who does not know how to speak German and purposely fakes his way through the film by using a combination of gibberish and random words thrown to him by Green, such as "Boba Fett", "OshKosh B'Gosh" and "Goldie Hawn". Kane Hodder portrays the film's hero Meshugannah – a Hassidic Jewish take on the classic Frankenstein monster, who ultimately turns against his master and kills him.

Holliston 
Based on Green's life and largely adapted from his romantic comedy Coffee & Donuts, the sitcom Holliston follows the lives of Adam (played by Green) and Joe (played by a fellow genre director and real-life best friend, Joe Lynch), two aspiring horror filmmakers living in the small town of Holliston, Massachusetts. Together they work at a local cable advertising station and struggle with fledgling careers, making ends meet and dealing with the opposite sex. The ensemble cast includes Laura Ortiz (who plays Laura, Joe's girlfriend), Corri English (who plays Corri, Adam's ex-girlfriend and the greatest heartbreak of his life), Dee Snider (who plays Lance Rockett, Adam and Joe's cross-dressing boss, still stuck in the 80's, who is the lead singer for a Van Halen cover band), and GWAR frontman Dave Brockie (who played Oderus, Adam's imaginary alien friend who lives in his closet).

Holliston was the first original series for FEARnet. Green wrote and directed the six episodes comprising season one of this show, mixing comedy, horror, romance, and described by the network as "Big Bang Theory meets Evil Dead 2". The first season was filmed in September–October 2011 and produced by ArieScope Pictures. Series was advertised in the January 13, 2012 issue of Entertainment Weekly and launched on the FEARnet network on April 3, 2012, with a second season formally announced after two episodes. Guest stars include Seth Green, John Landis, Kane Hodder, Brian Posehn, Ray Wise, Deanna Pappas, Derek Mears, Colton Dunn, Danielle Harris, Nick Ballard, Parry Shen, Magda Apanowicz, and Tony Todd.
In interviews Green has described Holliston as his "most passionate of passion projects" and explained that the show took him over 13 years to bring to fruition.

After the 2014 death of cast member Dave Brockie and the dissolving of FEARnet just a few weeks later, Holliston went on an indefinite hiatus. In July 2015, Entertainment Weekly announced that Holliston would return with a third season.

Hatchet III 
Hatchet III (2013) is the third feature of Green's franchise, directed by BJ McDonnell and starring Kane Hodder, Danielle Harris, Derek Mears. Production began in April 2012, and the film was released in United States theaters and VOD on June 14, 2013. In press announcements, Green passionately assured fans, disappointed about the substitute director, that he personally oversaw all development. Though Green has clearly stated that Hatchet III is meant to be the end of the story, and that he always had set out to make a trilogy, he has also speculated that this is only the ending to his story of Marybeth and Victor Crowley and that fans could potentially see more Hatchet films in the future with a different storyline, different characters, and (possibly) different storytellers behind the camera.
Rotten Tomatoes gave the film a 55% approval rating based on 22 reviews, and Metacritic rated it 25/100 based on eight reviews.
As part of Green's three-day fundraiser to benefit victims of the Boston Marathon bombing, all three films were shown in Hatchet Marathon on May 30, 2013, and filmmaker made a donation to One Fund Boston.

The Movie Crypt podcast 
Green and Joe Lynch's free weekly filmmaker interview and film commentary podcast launched on GeekNation in May 2013. The name references creators' sitcom Holliston, along with other inside jokes in the content. The talk show was recommended by Entertainment Weekly under the headline "20 podcasts you need to hear in 2015" (January 9, 2015; print issue #1345) and used as curriculum in film schools such as UCLA and Emerson. As of April 2015 the podcast is reported to have over 500,000 weekly listeners worldwide. Past guests' list includes Seth Green, Slash, Jordan Peele, Neil Marshall, Mick Garris, Tom Holland, Sid Haig, Kane Hodder, Bear McCreary, Danielle Harris, James Gunn, Mike Dougherty, Todd Farmer, Dave Brockie, Don Coscarelli, Stuart Gordan, Rachael Leigh Cook, Brian Slagel, Tony Todd, Bill Moseley and Chris Columbus.

Digging Up the Marrow 
Green's undercover project, Digging Up the Marrow, described as a reality based dark fantasy about monsters, was made in collaboration between Green and popular urban artist Alex Pardee. Production began in 2010 and was fully completed in 2014. In the documentary-style movie Green plays himself; Will Barratt, loyal Green collaborator since 1997, is cameraman; and actor Ray Wise portrays Detective William Dekker, an eccentric and mysterious man who contacts Green with the claim that monsters not only exist, but that he knows where to find them.

After an unofficial preview of a work-in-progress cut in 2013 at Harry Knowles's annual Butt-Numb-A-Thon, the final version of Digging Up The Marrow premiered at FrightFest in London on August 23, 2014. The film was released in US cinemas and VOD on February 20, 2015, and on DVD and Blu-ray March 24, 2015. Rotten Tomatoes reports that 53% of 15 surveyed critics gave the film a positive review; the average rating is 5.7/10. Metacritic rated it 45/100 based on eight reviews.

Adam Green's Scary Sleepover 
An internet series created and produced by Green and directed by Sean Becker, Adam Green's Scary Sleepover was launched on March 6, 2015. On the show, Green hosts various icons from the horror genre for a slumber party at his ArieScope Pictures Studio in Hollywood. While dressed in their pajamas, playing board games, eating junk food, watching movies, laying on the floor in sleeping bags, and doing the very things that children would do at a sleepover, Green gets the horror heavyweights to open up honestly about what exactly scares them in their real lives. Guests for the first season's 14 episodes included Kane Hodder, Tiffany Shepis, Danielle Harris, Sid Haig, Derek Mears, Laura Ortiz, Emma Bell, Bill Moseley, Darren Lynn Bousman, Zach Galligan, Jeffrey Reddick, and Tom Holland. The second season premiered on January 6, 2016 and included 14 more episodes featuring such iconic guests as Slash, Tony Todd, Dee Snider, Joe Lynch, Felissa Rose, Brea Grant, Lucky McKee, Ti West, Clare Kramer, Todd Farmer, Kristina Klebe, and Neil Marshall. A 30-minute "Scary Sleepover Christmas Special" starring Adam Green, Kane Hodder, Danielle Harris, Sid Haig, Bill Moseley, and Felissa Rose premiered on December 18, 2017. In the episode Green states that there will not be a third season of "Scary Sleepover" for "quite some time" due to his schedule. Green brought "Scary Sleepover" back in July 2020 for a truncated third season of episodes. Guests include Doug Benson, Brian Quinn, Corri English, and Parry Shen. The series finale premiered on December 25, 2020.

Horrified 
Horrified, an internet series created and directed by Adam Green and Sean Becker, was launched on July 17, 2015. Artists from all sides of the entertainment industry share their most horrifying personal stories in this confessional-style series hosted by Corri English (Holliston). From mortifying embarrassments, to comical moments of humility, to truly terrifying real life encounters, the series is presented in an old-time black and white Twilight Zone-style format, with English as the Rod Serling-esque host that sets up each week's true story. Guests for the first season's 22 episodes include Rachael Leigh Cook, Jeff Lewis, Mathew Waters, Jordan Ladd, Will Barratt, Amrapali Ambegaokar, Bear McCreary, Parry Shen, Joe Lynch, Trevor Snarr, Sarah Elbert, Tyler Mane, Jason Charles Miller, Kerri Kasem, Zack Ward, Ed Marx, Craig Borden, Brea Grant, Joel Murray, Milo Ventimiglia, and Ed Ackerman. A second season will premiere on January 25, 2017 including stories from Michael Rosenbaum, Laura Ortiz, Rudy Sarzo, Darren Lynn Bousman, Derek Mears, Sid Haig, Kelly Vrooman, Kristina Klebe, Roxanne Benjamin, Sean Becker, Marisha Ray, Matthew Mercer, Ace Von Johnson, Mike Mendez, Dave Parker, Alejandro Brugues, Colton Dunn, Casey Hempel, Arwen, Jan-Michael Losada, Joe Knetter, and Steve Barton.

Victor Crowley 
Victor Crowley (2017) is the fourth feature in Green's Hatchet franchise. Written and directed by Green, the film was produced in secret over 2015 and 2016, with Green unveiling the finished film as a complete surprise during a "10th Anniversary Event" for Hatchet at the Arclight Hollywood where it received two standing ovations on August 22, 2017. The film immediately premiered in London four days later (August 26, 2017) as part of UK FrightFest, where it received yet another standing ovation, marking only the second time a film has ever received a standing ovation at FrightFest in the festival's 18-year history. Green took the film on a 52-city theatrical world tour throughout the fall of 2017 in advance of its February 6, 2018 release on home video. The film stars Kane Hodder, Parry Shen, Laura Ortiz, Brian Quinn, Dave Sheridan, Felissa Rose, and Tiffany Shepis.

Friday the 13th: The Game 
Green wrote "The Jarvis Tapes" for Friday the 13th: The Game (2017). The 13 audio tapes detail the untold story of the Tommy Jarvis character from parts 4, 5, and 6 of the film franchise, and fill in the blanks for the character's exploits between and after the films he was featured in. The tapes were released into the video game on October 13, 2017, and received an extremely positive response from fans who enjoyed discovering the various Easter eggs that Green put into his scripts tying Tommy Jarvis into other popular horror franchises. The tapes contain references to the horror IPs A Nightmare on Elm Street, Halloween, Shocker, Hatchet, Behind the Mask: The Rise of Leslie Vernon, and E.T. the Extra-Terrestrial, as well as a nod to Green's dog, Arwen.

For the Love of Halloween 
For the Love of Halloween (2018) is a feature-length documentary film about Green and his company ArieScope Pictures' 20-year tradition of making short films for Halloween every year since 1998. As part of ArieScope's 20th anniversary celebration, the film was released as a surprise gift for Green's fans on September 18, 2018, and offered to stream for free on ArieScope.com and on ArieScope's official YouTube Channel. The documentary covers all 20 years of Halloween shorts, including such viral hits as 2008's The Tivo, 2009's Jack Chop, 2012's Driving Lessons, and 2015's Monster Problems. Made by Green and the ArieScope staff of interns/assistants, the documentary features ArieScope Halloween short film veterans Kane Hodder, Joel David Moore, Paul Solet, Sid Haig, Derek Mears, Brea Grant, and Laura Ortiz.

Killer Pizza 
Killer Pizza is an action adventure film being produced by 1492 Pictures. Based on Greg Taylor's children book of the same title, story follows sixteen-year-old Toby McGill, who gets a summer job at a mysterious Cape Cod pizza parlor only to discover that the restaurant is actually a front for a top secret monster hunting organization. Recruited into a band of heroic misfits, Toby spends his summer battling horrifying monsters and trying to save the world from imminent destruction at the hands of a mythical and deadly monster prophecy.

Music career

Haddonfield 
In 1998, Green formed the hard rock and metal band Haddonfield, which he fronted as the lead singer. A large regional draw in the Boston area, the band was put on the back burner for several years when Green's film career took off and relocated him to Los Angeles in the 2000s. On July 24, 2017, it was announced that Green had made Haddonfield fully active once again, and that the band had signed with Megadeth bassist David Ellefson's EMP Label Group, who would be putting out the band's debut record Ghosts of Salem in conjunction with Green's own imprint label ArieScope Records. Ghosts of Salem was released digitally worldwide on September 15, 2017, with the physical CD version and a limited edition vinyl version arriving in stores just one month later on October 13, 2017. Haddonfield celebrated the album release with a performance at the Worcester Palladium in Worcester, Massachusetts, on October 14, 2017, on a bill that also featured Ministry, Superjoint Ritual, DevilDriver, and Motionless in White.

On July 11, 2019, Haddonfield's bass player Chris Permatteo died from natural causes. When Green addressed Permatteo's death on The Movie Crypt podcast the following Monday, he stated that Haddonfield would not continue on, and that he would never perform their songs on stage again.

Discography
Ghosts of Salem (2017)

Filmography

Feature films

Television series 
 It's a Mall World (2007) – short form mini-series, 13 episodes
 Winter Tales (2007) – claymation mini-series, 5 episodes
 Cheerleader Camp (2007) – half-hour comedy, pilot episode
 Sexy Nightmare Slayers (2011) – comedy, pilot episode
 Holliston (2012-2013) – half-hour horror sitcom, 6+11 episodes
 Adam Green's Scary Sleepover (2015-2020) – biographical talk-show, 33 episodes
 Horrified (2015–2017) – biographical talk-show, 44 episodes
 Heart Baby Eggplant (2020) – 7 episodes

Short films 
 A Voice Named Reason (1996)
 Columbus Day Weekend (1998)
 Stagefright (2000)
 Oh, Sherrie (2001)
 Steven's Room (2002)
 The Real World Hollywood (2003)
 Midnight (2004)
 Trick or Treat (2005)
 King in the Box (2006)
 The Tiffany Problem (2007)
 The Tivo (2008)
 Fairy Tale Police (2008)
 Saber (2009)
 Jack Chop (2009)
 Just Take One (2010)
 The Diary of Anne Frankenstein (2011) (segment from Chillerama)
 Downloading and You (2011)
 Driving Lessons (2012)
 Halloween Hugs (2013)
 Saber III (2014)
 Turn Off Your Bloody Phone (2014)
 Happy Halloween (2014)
 Monster Problems (2015)
 Don't Do It! (2016)
 A Holliston Halloween (2017)
 The Intervention (2018)
 Pumpkin Dick (2019) 
 Full Size (2020)
 Ghost Dog (2021)
 Halloween Costume Cruelty (2022)

Acting roles 
 Columbus Day Weekend (1998) Michael Myers
 Coffee & Donuts (2000) Adam
 Steven's Room (2002) Matt
 The Real World Hollywood (2003) Shlomo
 Hatchet (2006) Buddy #1
 The Eden Formula (TV Sci-Fi – 2006) Maury
 The Tiffany Problem (2007) Gilligan
 Winter Tales (2007) Voices
 Gingerdead Man 2: Passion of the Crust (2008) Toothless McHomeless
 Fairy Tale Police (2008) Rudolph
 Jack Chop (2009) 
 Grace (2009) Meat Clerk
 Ultradome (2010) Jedi Knight
 Frozen (2010) 
 Look: The Series (TV drama – 2010) Club Patron
 Just Take One (2010) Ernie
 Hatchet II (2010) Buddy #1
 Holliston (TV sitcom – season 1 – 2012) Adam
 Holliston (TV sitcom – season 2 – 2013) Adam
 Halloween Hugs (2013) Adam
 Hatchet III (2013) Drunken Prisoner
 Digging Up the Marrow (2015) Adam Green
 20 Seconds To Live (2015) Husband
 Tales of Halloween (2015) Carlo
 Victor Crowley (2017) Craig
 A Holliston Halloween (2017) Adam
 The Intervention (2018) Adam
 Video Palace (2018) Adam
 Full Size (2020) Adam

Other appearances 
 The Making of 'Hatchet (2007)
 Anatomy of a Kill (2007)
 A Twisted Tale (2007)
 Guts & Gore: The FX of 'Hatchet''' (2007)
 Meeting Victor Crowley (2007)
 The Making of 'Spiral (2008)
 The Road to FrightFest (2008)
 His Name Was Jason: 30 Years of Friday the 13th (2009)
 The Road to FrightFest II: American Douchebags in London (2009)
 Grace: Conception (2009)
 Grace: Family (2009)
 Grace: Delivered (2009)
 The Psycho Legacy (2009)
 Into the Dark: Exploring the Horror Film (2009?)
 Brides of Horror (2010)
 The Rotten Tomatoes Show (2010)
 The Road to FrightFest III: The Douchebrothers Project (2010)
 The Making of Anne Frankenstein (2011)
 The Road to Holliston (2012)
 Adam Green's Scary Sleepover (2015-2020)
 Horrified (2015)
 Shudder's The Core (2017)
 Fly On The Set – The Making of Victor Crowley (2018)
 Raising The Dead... Again – An Interview about Victor Crowley (2018)
 Steven Tyler: Out On A Limb (2018)
 Wolfman's Got Nards (2018)
 Survival of the Film Freaks (2018)
 Video Palace (2018)
 FrightFest: Beneath the Dark Heart of Cinema (2018)
 Shudder's The Last Drive-In (2020)
 This is GWAR'' (2021)

Bibliography

Awards and nominations

References

External links 

Adam Green interviewed on Talk Radio Meltdown

1975 births
Living people
People from Holliston, Massachusetts
American male writers
Hofstra University alumni
Horror film directors
Film directors from Massachusetts